WEIU (88.9 FM) is a 4,000 watt effective radiated power radio station in Charleston, Illinois.  Owned by Eastern Illinois University, it is a sister station to campus television station WEIU-TV. The two stations share studios on the EIU campus in Charleston. The station licensee, Eastern Illinois University is authorized by the Federal Communications Commission. The station first signed on in 1982.

Mission
WEIU is a student-run campus radio station operating under a guise of a regular-formatted hit radio station. Its aim is to give EIU students hands-on experience and responsibilities in the professional world of radio broadcasting, under various conditions that can be experienced in the real world.

History
WEIU signed on in 1982 as a progressive alternative college radio station airing diverse formats. The station signed off at midnight.  On September 9, 2004, Hit-Mix was born.  The new 24-hour format not only serves students, but the people of Coles County playing the top hits from the 1950s through today.  Requests are always taken via phone or email.  Hit-mix also streams online at their website.  There have been numerous graduates of WEIU that have gone on to work at commercial stations.

External links
Hit Mix 88.9
The Odyssey - EIU's Online Podcast Station

EIU
EIU
Radio stations established in 1982
EIU
1982 establishments in Illinois